Kathy Poohachof is a retired American para-alpine skier. She represented the United States at the 1980 Winter Paralympics in Geilo, Norway and at the 1984 Winter Paralympics in Innsbruck, Austria. In total, she won five silver medals in alpine skiing.

See also 
 List of Paralympic medalists in alpine skiing

References

External links 
 

Living people
Year of birth missing (living people)
Place of birth missing (living people)
American female alpine skiers
Paralympic alpine skiers of the United States
Alpine skiers at the 1980 Winter Paralympics
Alpine skiers at the 1984 Winter Paralympics
Medalists at the 1980 Winter Paralympics
Medalists at the 1984 Winter Paralympics
Paralympic silver medalists for the United States